Cătălin Mihai Savin (born 8 November 1990) is a Romanian professional footballer who plays as a defender for AFC Odorheiu Secuiesc.

Honours
Turris Turnu Măgurele
Liga III: 2018–19

Odorheiu Secuiesc
Liga III: 2021–22

References

External links
 
 

1990 births
Living people
People from Odorheiu Secuiesc
Romanian footballers
Association football defenders
Liga I players
Liga II players
Liga III players
CS Gaz Metan Mediaș players
CS Concordia Chiajna players
FC Rapid București players
CS Afumați players
CS Minaur Baia Mare (football) players
FK Csíkszereda Miercurea Ciuc players
AFC Turris-Oltul Turnu Măgurele players
FC Gloria Buzău players